Pseudoeurycea firscheini is a species of salamander in the family Plethodontidae. It is endemic to the Sierra Madre de Oaxaca of west-central Veracruz, Mexico, and known from Acultzingo (its type locality) on the Puebla–Veracruz border eastward to the Sierra Zongolica. It is also known as the Firschein's false brook salamander or simply Firschein's salamander. The specific name firscheini honors Mr. Irwin Lester Firschein, an American biologist, geneticists, and anthropologist. The authors acknowledge Firschein for his  explorations on Volcan San Martin, said to "have done much toward stimulating interest in this region of Mexico".

Description
The adults have small, lichen-like light spots on the tail. The sides and the underparts of the body are almost black. The hind legs are relatively large. The fingers are less than half-webbed, whereas the slender toes are about one-third webbed.

Habitat and conservation

The dependence of Pseudoeurycea firscheini on large bromeliad-covered trees makes it susceptible to habitat loss caused by expanding agriculture and human settlements and by wood extraction. The species might be present in the Cañón del Río Blanco National Park, but this has yet to be confirmed. Mexican law protects it under the "Special Protection" category.

References

firscheini
Endemic amphibians of Mexico
Fauna of the Sierra Madre de Oaxaca
Amphibians described in 1955
Taxa named by Frederick A. Shannon
Taxonomy articles created by Polbot